West Hazleton is a borough in Luzerne County, Pennsylvania, United States.

History
West Hazleton was founded by Conrad Horn, and it was officially established as a borough on March 12, 1887. West Hazleton gained prominence in the 19th and 20th centuries as an active anthracite coal mining community; it attracted thousands of European immigrants. The first burgess was J.W. McMurtrie; he served from 1888 to 1890. West Hazleton was once home to Hazle Park, a popular attraction in the area. The legendary Babe Ruth played at the nearby Cranberry Ballpark.

Geography

West Hazleton is located at  (40.961651, -75.998915). West Hazleton is a small strip of land west of Hazleton City; it is mostly concentrated around PA Route 93. Interstate 81 runs through the northern section of the borough. West Hazleton is mostly residential; it also consists of two shopping centers, an industrial park, a movie theater, and a youth sports complex.

Education
West Hazleton is part of Hazleton Area School District. West Hazleton Elementary/Middle School is located within the borough.

Demographics

As of the 2010 census, West Hazleton was 71.9% White, 3.1% Black or African American, 0.4% Native American, 0.3% Asian, 0.1% Native Hawaiian, and 3.4% were two or more races. 35.4% of the population were of Hispanic or Latino ancestry, up from just 2.2% in 2000.

As of the census of 2000, there were 3,542 people, 1,634 households, and 915 families residing in the borough. The population density was 2,281.0 people per square mile (882.3/km2). There were 1,834 housing units at an average density of 1,181.1 per square mile (456.8/km2). The racial makeup of the borough was 97.71% White, 0.56% African American, 0.06% Native American, 0.23% Asian, 1.02% from other races, and 0.42% from two or more races. Hispanic or Latino of any race were 2.23% of the population.

There were 1,634 households, out of which 21.6% had children under the age of 18 living with them, 38.9% were married couples living together, 12.0% had a female householder with no husband present, and 44.0% were non-families. 39.2% of all households were made up of individuals, and 18.6% had someone living alone who was 65 years of age or older. The average household size was 2.13 and the average family size was 2.86.

In the borough the population was spread out, with 20.3% under the age of 18, 6.7% from 18 to 24, 27.4% from 25 to 44, 22.4% from 45 to 64, and 23.1% who were 65 years of age or older. The median age was 42 years. For every 100 females there were 92.8 males. For every 100 females age 18 and over, there were 88.1 males.

The median income for a household in the borough was $28,765, and the median income for a family was $37,476. Males had a median income of $30,139 versus $18,400 for females. The per capita income for the borough was $16,525. About 7.3% of families and 10.0% of the population were below the poverty line, including 13.8% of those under age 18 and 11.1% of those age 65 or over.

References

External links
 

Populated places established in 1889
Boroughs in Luzerne County, Pennsylvania
1889 establishments in Pennsylvania